Maruthonkara  is a village and grama panchayat in Kozhikode district in the state of Kerala, India.  The nearest town situated near by here is Kuttiyadi. Peruvannamuzhi, Thottilpalam, Chempanoda, kunduthode, chengaroth and Passukkadavu are near by places from here.

Landmarks
St. Mary's Forane Church was established on Maruthonkara in 1939. Here there is a Higher Secondary School situated called as St. Mary's HSS Maruthonkara. The place is also pronounced as Marudonkara and Mullankunnu.

Demographics
 India census, Maruthonkara had a population of 21852 with 10805 males and 11047 females.

Transportation
Maruthonkara village connects to other parts of India through Vatakara town on the west and Kuttiady town on the east.  National highway No.66 passes through Vatakara and the northern stretch connects to Mangalore, Goa and Mumbai.  The southern stretch connects to Cochin and Trivandrum.  The eastern National Highway No.54 going through Kuttiady connects to Mananthavady, Mysore and Bangalore. The nearest airports are at Kannur and Kozhikode.  The nearest railway station is at Vatakara.

References

Kuttiady area